Justine Henin was the defending champion, but retired earlier in the year.

Seventh-seeded italian Roberta Vinci won the tournament beating unseeded Australian Jelena Dokić 6–7(7–9), 6–3, 7–5 in the final.

Seeds

Qualifying draw

Draw

Finals

Top half

Bottom half

References

External links
 Main draw

UNICEF Open - Singles